Sodium tellurite is an inorganic tellurium compound with formula Na2TeO3. It is a water-soluble white solid and a weak reducing agent. Sodium tellurite is an intermediate in the extraction of the element, tellurium; it is a product obtained from anode slimes and is a precursor to tellurium.

Preparation
The main source of tellurium is from copper anode slimes, which contain precious metals as well as various tellurides. These slimes are roasted with sodium carbonate and oxygen to produce sodium tellurite.

Ag2Te + Na2CO3 + O2 → 2Ag + Na2TeO3 + CO2 (400–500 °C)

This is a reaction with silver telluride. The telluride is oxidized to tellurite and the silver(I) is reduced to silver.

Purification
The electrolysis of a tellurite solution yields purified tellurium.

Anode: 4OH− → 2H2O + O2 + 4e−
Cathode: TeO32− + 3H2O + 4e− → Te + 6OH−

Structure and properties
Tellurium has properties similar to sulfur and selenium. In the anhydrous form Na2TeO3 the tellurium atoms are 6 coordinate, three Te-O at 1.87 Å and three at 2.9 Å, with distorted octahedra sharing edges. In the pentahydrate, Na2TeO3.5H2O there are discrete tellurite anions, TeO32− which are pyramidal. The Te-O distance is 1.85 - 1.86 Å and the O-Te-O angle is close to 99.5°. The tellurite anion is a weak base. Sodium tellurite would be similar to sodium selenite and sodium sulfite. Sodium tellurite is both a weak oxidizing agent and a weak reducing agent.

Tellurite-related reactions
H2TeO3 → H+ + HTeO3− pK 2.48

Telluric acid loses a proton at this pKa.

HTeO3− → H+ + TeO32− pK 7.7

Hydrogen tellurite loses a proton at this pKa to become the tellurite ion. This would happen in the reaction of tellurous acid with sodium hydroxide to make sodium tellurite.

TeO2 + 2OH− → TeO32− + H2O

This is the reaction of tellurium dioxide with a base to make a tellurite salt.

Applications
Sodium tellurite improves the corrosion resistance of electroplated nickel layers. Solutions of sodium tellurite are used for black or blue-black coatings on iron, steel, aluminum, and copper. In microbiology, sodium tellurite can be added to the growth medium to isolate bacteria with an inherent physiological resistance to its toxicity.

References

Cameo Chemicals. Sodium Tellurite. Retrieved March 8, 2009. Website: http://cameochemical.noaa.gov/chemical/5185.

Tellurites
Sodium compounds